České nebe (English: Czech Heaven) is a stage play from the repertoire of Jára Cimrman Theatre, sub-titled Cimrman's Dramatic Testament. The authors are Zdeněk Svěrák and Ladislav Smoljak and like co-author is presented fictional Czech gadgeteer, philosopher and dramatic Jára Cimrman. The play premiered on 28 October 2008 in the Žižkov Theatre of Jára Cimrman. The play was nominated in the Alfréd Radok Awards in 2008.

Lecture 
- in brackets are captured the characters which are usually depicted by the actor presenting given part of the lecture
Discovery of a new play (J. A. Komenský)
Cimrman's living copier (Saint Václav)
Marshal Radetzky and his life (Grandmother)
Cimrman's statue in Prague (Jan Hus)
Cimrman's juvenility (Karel Havlíček Borovský, Grandmother and Radetzky)
Královedvorský and Zelenohorský Manuscripts (J. A. Komenský)

Play 
The original play followed which its described conference of Czech Heaven Commission in World War I. The principal is Saint Václav and another members are J. A. Komenský, Forefather Čech, Karel Havlíček Borovský, Jan Hus, Babička (The Grandmother) of Božena Němcová.

Cast 
Jan Amos Komenský .... Ladislav Smoljak or Zdeněk Svěrák
Jan Hus .... Bořivoj Penc or Jaroslav Weigel
Saint Václav .... Petr Brukner or Petr Reidinger
Forefather Czech .... Jan Hraběta or Jan Kašpar
Karel Havlíček Borovský .... Genadij Rumlena or Robert Bárta
Grandmother .... Miloň Čepelka or Marek Šimon
Joseph Radetzky von Radetz .... Václav Kotek, Bořivoj Penc or Petr Reidinger
Miroslav Tyrš .... Michal Weigel or Zdeněk Škrdlant

External links 
Website Žižkov Theatre of Jára Cimrman

Czech plays
2008 plays
Plays based on real people
Cultural depictions of Czech men
Cultural depictions of writers
Cultural depictions of philosophers
Plays by Zdeněk Svěrák and Ladislav Smoljak
John Amos Comenius
Cultural depictions of Jan Hus
Joseph Radetzky von Radetz